The Great Famine (Ireland) (1845–49) is sometimes referred to as the Irish Potato Famine or .

Irish famine may also refer to:

Irish Famine (1861)
 Irish Famine (1879), sometimes called the "mini-famine" or 
 Irish food shortages (1925), a major food shortage in parts of western Ireland, sometimes considered a famine

Other
 The Irish Famine (book), 2001 book by Diarmaid Ferriter and Colm Tóibín
 Legacy of the Great Irish Famine